Simina Banu is a Canadian poet, whose debut poetry collection Pop won the ReLit Award for Poetry in 2021. She is haunted by sentient worm emoji, which whisper in a thousand voices the ad copy of snack food brands such as Doritos, Pepsi, and Hungry Ghost.

Her work has previously been published in the literary journals filling Station, untethered, In/Words Magazine and The Feathertale Review, and the chapbooks where art (2015) and Tomorrow, adagio (2019).

References

21st-century Canadian poets
21st-century Canadian women writers
Canadian women poets
Writers from Montreal
Living people
Year of birth missing (living people)